Papilio palinurus, the emerald swallowtail, emerald peacock, or green-banded peacock, is a butterfly of the genus Papilio of the family Papilionidae. It is native to Southeast Asia, but is regularly kept in butterfly houses around the world.

Subspecies
There are several subspecies (from Burma, Borneo, Indonesia, Nias and the Philippines).

 P. p. palinurus – Burma, Malaysia Borneo
 P. p. auffenbergi Späth, 1992 – Simeulue, Indonesia
 P. p. nymphodorus (Fruhstorfer) – Island of Basilan
 P. p. adventus (Fruhstorfer) – Island of Nias
 P. p. daedalus (C. & R. Felder, 1861) – Philippines
 P. p. angustatus (Staudinger, 1888) – Island of Palawan, Philippines

Etymology
The genus name Papilio comes from the Latin word papilio meaning butterfly. The species name palinurus derives from Palinurus, the name of the pilot of Aeneas's boat in Virgil's Aeneid.

Description
The dorsal sides of the wings are covered by a powder of green scales and the background vary from dark greenish to black, with broad bright emerald green metallic bands. The undersides are black with orange, white and blue spots along the edges of hindwings, that show extended tails at the end.

The flight of these butterflies is swift and quite fast. Caterpillars feed on plants of genus Euodia belonging to the Rutaceae, commonly known as the rue or citrus family.

Green by structural coloration

The iridescent green sheen of the bands of this butterfly is not produced by pigments, but is structural coloration produced by the microstructure of the wing scales. They refract the light and give rise to blue and yellow visible reflections, producing the perception of green color when additively mixed.

Distribution
This species can be found primarily in Southeast Asia, particularly in Burma – Peninsular Malaysia, Sumatra, Borneo, Indonesia (Simeulue, Island of Nias), Philippines (Basilan, Palawan, Balabac, Cuyo, Busuanga, and Dumaran).

Habitat
Papilio palinurus lives in Asian primary forests.

Gallery

References

Further reading
Erich Bauer and Thomas Frankenbach (1998). Schmetterlinge der Erde, Butterflies of the World Part I (1), Papilionidae Papilionidae I: Papilio, Subgenus Achillides, Bhutanitis, Teinopalpus. Edited by Erich Bauer and Thomas Frankenbach. Keltern: Goecke & Evers; Canterbury: Hillside Books  
 Zipcodezoo
 Biolib
 Funet.fi

External links

 Encyclopedia of Life
 Cambridge Butterfly Conservatory

palinurus
Fauna of Southeast Asia
Butterflies described in 1787
Butterflies of Borneo
Butterflies of Indochina